Chloe Elizabeth Lukasiak  (born May 25, 2001) is an American actress, dancer and reality television personality. She gained recognition as a child for being an original cast member of Lifetime's reality television series Dance Moms during Season 1 through Season 4, where she quickly became a fan favorite. She later returned in the latter half of season 7.

Lukasiak has since transitioned from dancing to acting. Her film roles include Gwen Murphy in Center Stage: On Pointe (2016), Alexandra "Lexi" Smith in Loophole (2017), Savanah Stocker in A Cowgirl's Story (2017), Mallory in F.R.E.D.I (2018), Jasmine Joel in Next Level (2019), Ashley in Beautiful Scars (2020) and Devin Dupree in Camp Arrowhead (2020). Her social media presence includes over 14 million followers across multiple platforms, including Instagram where she has over 7 million followers.

Early life
Lukasiak was born on May 25, 2001 in Pittsburgh, Pennsylvania to Christina "Christi" (née Zook) and Marc Lukasiak. She has a younger sister, Clara. The family resides in Mars, Pennsylvania. She is of Polish, Scottish, German, and Italian descent.

Lukasiak began dance classes at the Abby Lee Dance Company at age two. At first, she did "the basics" such as jazz and ballet. But as she got older she started to do more styles and has trained in everything except ballroom. From the ages of five to thirteen, Lukasiak competed throughout the United States as part of the Abby Lee Dance Company, winning numerous titles at the regional, state, and national levels. Lukasiak competed on Dance Moms in many dance genres: lyrical, contemporary, musical theatre, ballet, jazz, hip-hop, acro, Spanish, and Bollywood.

Career

2011-2019: Dance Moms and dance career 

In 2011, Lukasiak and her mother, alongside Abby Lee Dance Company owner Abby Lee Miller, other young dancers, and their mothers, were cast on Lifetime's Dance Moms. Together they made up Miller's Junior Elite Competition Team.

After the Los Angeles national competition in July 2014 (filmed for an episode aired October 7, 2014), Lukasiak's mother decided that the environment of the TV show along with her own negative relationship with Miller was detrimental to her daughter and they decided to leave ALDC. The finale episode of Season 4 was their last appearance on Dance Moms as part of the main cast partially because of Miller being unappreciative about the fact that Lukasiak was the highest scoring ALDC soloist at Nationals, beating teammates Kendall Vertes and Kamryn Beck and Miller making a nasty comment about Chloe’s eye. After the end of Season 4, Lukasiak left ALDC for good and switched to Studio 19 Dance Complex. Lukasiak's competition team from Studio 19 went on to win nationals in July 2015.

In high demand now that she was free of the ALDC, Lukasiak was invited to be a demonstrator and assistant for Blake McGrath in the VIP Dance Events convention (Calgary, Oct. 2014). Lukasiak has also posted many professionally-filmed dance videos on her YouTube channel as a series called Team Chloe Dance Project. She won "Choice Dancer" at the 2015 Teen Choice Awards and the "Dancers Choice Award" for "Favorite Dancer 17 & Under" at the 2015 Industry Dance Awards. She was once again nominated for the "Choice Dancer" award at the 2016 & 2017 Teen Choice Awards. She was nominated for a Shorty Award in the category of 'Best in Dance' but lost to Misty Copeland. Lukasiak joined the Triple Threat Talent Tour as a guest performer and assistant for several dance conventions in 2015/2016. In 2016, Lukasiak collaborated with Playtex Sport and starred in their "Ready, Set, Play On!" campaign commercial as a dancer. That same year, Lukasiak partnered with Ownzones to launch her own dance web series called Chloe on Pointe.

On January 27, 2017, Lukasiak announced that she would return to guest-star on Dance Moms for the Season 7 finale and Season 7B. Lukasiak first joined Murrieta Dance Project, but then left to form The Irreplaceables with Nia Sioux, Kendall Vertes, Kalani Hilliker, and Camryn Bridges. Lukasiak signed with Lifetime in April 2017 to star in her own web series called "Chloe Does It". In 2017, Lukasiak filmed an anti-bullying dance video for Seventeen Magazine. In December 2017, Lukasiak began touring with Kalani Hilliker and Kendall Vertes on The Irreplaceables Tour.

In 2019, Lukasiak took part in the Tate McRae "Tear Myself Apart" Dance Contest, placing in the top 5 out of over 100 participants.

2011-present: Transition to acting and acting debut
In 2011, Lukasiak started her acting career with an acting lesson from Howard Fine for her role in LUX's (daughter of actor Ted Danson) music video for It's Like Summer. Then, in 2012, Lukasiak auditioned for the role of "Young Deb" on the Lifetime show Drop Dead Diva, but lost the role to fellow Dance Moms cast member, Maddie Ziegler. Lukasiak also auditioned for the role of "Annie" in the 2012 Broadway musical Annie, but lost the part to Actresses Lilla Crawford and Sadie Sink. Lukasiak later auditioned in 2013 for the role of "Maddy" in the 2015 film Spare Parts, but lost the role to Actress Aubrey Miller. Lukasiak's debut acting role was as Gwen Murphy in the 2016 Lifetime TV movie Center Stage: On Pointe. In an interview released on June 15, 2016, Lukasiak said she was grateful to Dance Moms because it showed her how much she loves acting and that she has a passion for it. She was later cast as Savanah Stocker in A Cowgirl's Story alongside former Bridge to Terabithia star Bailee Madison. Lukasiak has since been cast as the lead role in the science-fiction/inspirational thriller called Loophole, and supporting roles in the family-friendly movies Camp Arrowhead, Next Level, and F.R.E.D.I. In 2016, Lukasiak played a character named Flynn Harrington for episodes in a TV series called Welcome To My World, however, the series never made it to air.  Lukasiak appeared in a commercial for the tv show Superstore in 2016 as a store employee.  Lukasiak has also provided her acting talents in the 2020 short film Beautiful Scars as a Co-Lead with two other actors and a character for a story called Limelight in an Interactive app called YarnTexts. In February 2020, Lukasiak appeared as a Werewolf in a promotional short for the Disney Channel original movie, Zombies 2. On April 22, 2021, Lukasiak acted in the Earth Day comedy skit Earth Day! The Musical with Bill Nye, Justin Bieber, Zac Efron and other celebrities on Facebook Watch.

2012-present: Other ventures

Fashion, modeling and endorsements 
Lukasiak began modeling for fashion lines Glitzy Girl, Oxyjen, Tutu DuMonde and Sally Miller in 2012-13. Lukasiak then became a spokesmodel for Just For Kix, an American dancewear company, in October 2014. With the company's partnership, she created an anti-bullying campaign called #NobodyisYOU. She was featured in several videos relating to the cause alongside dancers such as Averee Jade. Following her leave from Dance Moms in 2014, she modeled for various clothing brands including 90 Degrees by Reflex, Good hYOUman, Boy Meets Girl, and BCBG Max Azria (runway). In 2016, Lukasiak became the new face of StyleHaul. Lukasiak has also modeled for many magazines including The Hollywood Reporter, In Touch Weekly, Nationalist, Inside Dance, LVLten, LowCountry Parent, Cliche, NKD, Pulse Spikes, Dream, YSBNow, Afterglow, Popstar, Girls' Life, Prune, Dance Track and A Book Of.

In 2015, Lukasiak appeared in a commercial for the fast food chain, Sonic. In 2017, Lukasiak began working on a fashion line in collaboration with Dazzine. That same year, after Dazzine unexpectedly folded, she curated the Rocking Ballerina shoe/fashion line with JustFab. and a Christmas fashion line through the same company. Lukasiak also hosted the miniseries Wicked Weekly that year, which was 16 episodes that aired on Disney Channel leading up to the release of the 2017 Disney Channel original film, Descendants 2.  In 2018, Lukasiak became an ambassador for JustFab and released videos featuring monthly shoe picks from the brand. During NY Fashion Week in February 2018, Lukasiak became a "Gelwick Girl," being styled by Andrew Gelwicks for her book tour and fashion shows at New York Fashion Week.  Lukasiak started partnering with Maybelline in 2019 and appeared in an ad for their product Snapscara alongside Skai Jackson, Summer McKeen, Jordyn Jones and Roxette Arisa. Later that year, Lukasiak collabed with Victoria's Secret PINK and Awesomeness TV to host a miniseries titled 'GRL PWR', which is about women's goals and life in college.  In 2022, Lukasiak collaborated with Evry Jewels for a jewelry line that launched on January 15.

Music videos 
Lukasiak has appeared in numerous music videos, as during the filming of Dance Moms she appeared in videos for artists Brooke Hyland and LUX (daughter of actor Ted Danson). Also during the filming of Dance Moms, Lukasiak created a fan made music video for Katy Perry's Last Friday Night with Maddie Ziegler using the app Video Star; the video has over 10 million views on YouTube.  In 2015, she appeared as the lead for Jess Godwin's song "Fool Me Once", Solveig Romero's "Turn It Up" and Bianca Ryan's "Alice", as well as "Wrapped Up For Christmas" by Forever in Your Mind. In 2016, Lukasiak appeared in AJ Lehrman's music video for his new single "Tongue" and a video for transgender vocalist Ali J for her cover of "Piece By Piece" by Kelly Clarkson, which was featured on CNN. Lukasiak had a supporting role in her former Dance Moms costar Nia Sioux's music video for her song "Dance (Just Rock)" in 2017.  Lukasiak most recently appeared in a music video in 2019 for Barbie called "We're Taking Over."

Writing career 
During her second year of high school Lukasiak took a creative writing class. After that she began writing short stories and poems and decided to pursue a career in writing. She contributed a piece detailing her experience with overcoming bullying in the 2016 Pulse Spikes book "Ignite!". Lukasiak signed with Bloomsbury Publishing in 2017 and the next year released her debut book Girl on Pointe: Chloe's Guide to Taking On The World. Lukasiak also wrote, prepared and gave a speech at the 2017 UN International Day of Peace at the United Nations Headquarters in New York City, New York.

In 2018, Lukasiak teamed up with Girls' Life Magazine to launch Chloe's Book Club. In 2020, the partnership ended and the book club became Bestie Book Club. In February 2021, Lukasiak re-launched the book club under her own leadership rather than under a partnership. On November 18, 2021, it was announced that Lukasiak partnered up with Literati for her book club now titled Let's Escape.

In May 2020, Lukasiak created an Instagram account dedicated to sharing things that she has written with her fans and has announced her intention to write a fantasy book series. In April 2021, Lukasiak announced that she had written a piece of Rosie Day's upcoming book Instructions for a Teenage Armageddon: 30 Kick-Ass Women On How To Take Over The World. The book was released on October 14, 2021.

Political views and activism 
Lukasiak has expressed publicly that she is Liberal and showed support for US President Joe Biden during the 2020 Presidential Election.  On social media, Lukasiak has come out in support of immigrants, LGBTQ youth, mental health support, anti-drug pledges, animal rights, preventing school shootings, kindness, Black Lives Matter, women's rights and awareness of eating disorders.

Personal life

In 2015, Lukasiak was diagnosed with silent sinus syndrome, and had surgery to correct the condition.

In an interview, Lukasiak said she practices dancing four days a week except when she is traveling. She stopped competing in dance competitions in 2016 due to her growing list of commitments. Outside of dance, Lukasiak makes time for friends including her former ALDC teammates Paige Hyland, Nia Sioux, and Brooke Hyland.

In 2019, Lukasiak was accepted into Pepperdine University, where she is studying creative writing, and is on track to graduate in the Fall of 2023. In April 2020, Lukasiak revealed that she had been battling three types of eating disorders for the past few years by posting a poem that she had written about it on her Instagram account. Lukasiak elaborated more about her experience with her eating disorders in a YouTube video on her official YouTube channel.

On October 7, 2021, Lukasiak publicly confirmed her relationship with skater and influencer Brooklinn "Brook" Khoury. The two have been dating since November 2020.

Filmography

Film

Television

Music videos

Podcast

Web series

Awards and nominations

Writings

Tours
Christi & Chloe's UK Tour (2014)
Christi & Chloe's UK Tour (2015)
Christi & Chloe's OZ Tour: Sequins & Secrets (2015)
Triple Threat Talent Tour (2015–16)
The Irreplaceables Tour (2017–18)

See also
 List of dancers

Notes

References

External links
 
 Chloe Does It 
 

2001 births
Living people
21st-century American actresses
Actresses from Pittsburgh
American child actresses
American fashion designers
American female dancers
American film actresses
American people of German descent
American people of Italian descent
American people of Polish descent
American people of Scottish descent
American television actresses
American women fashion designers
American YouTubers
Dancers from Pennsylvania
American LGBT rights activists
Participants in American reality television series